Western High School is a public high school under the Clark County School District in Nevada, United States. The school opened in 1960, and was the third high school built in Las Vegas, Nevada, after Las Vegas High School (1931) and Rancho High School (1954). The campus is located at 4601 West Bonanza Road, Las Vegas, Nevada. In March 2011 Western was identified as one of five "persistently" low-performing schools in Clark County, Nevada, eligible for federal School Improvement grants. Under the turnaround model for school improvement Western introduced a curriculum of science, technology, engineering and math.

Notable alumni 
Fred Cole (musician), lead singer for the Weeds, The Lollipop Shoppe, Dead Moon
Lawrence Guy, defensive tackle for the New England Patriots
Corinna Harney, Playboy's Playmate of the Month for August 1991 and Playboy's Playmate of the Year 1992
Frank Hawkins, former NFL player
Nicole (Ellingwood) Malachowski, first female pilot for the United States Air Force Thunderbirds
Sean (Allen) McCaw, professional basketball player
Nick Oshiro, drummer for Static-X
Brett Sperry, gallerist, video game pioneer, and Las Vegas developer
Ronnie Vannucci Jr., drummer for The Killers

References

External links 
Western High School official website

Clark County School District
Educational institutions established in 1960
School buildings completed in 1960
High schools in Las Vegas
Public high schools in Nevada
1960s establishments in Nevada